Irving Knott Baxter (March 25, 1876 in Utica, New York – June 13, 1957 in Utica, New York) was an American athlete, who won the gold medal in both the men's high jump and the pole vault at the 1900 Summer Olympics, in Paris, France.

Baxter also took second place to Ray Ewry in all three of the standing jumps (long, triple, and high) in 1900.

He graduated from Trinity College in Hartford, CT in 1899 and the University of Pennsylvania School of Law in 1901
Baxter is buried at Forest Hill Cemetery in Utica, New York.

References

External links

1876 births
1957 deaths
Sportspeople from Utica, New York
American male high jumpers
American male pole vaulters
Athletes (track and field) at the 1900 Summer Olympics
Olympic gold medalists for the United States in track and field
Olympic silver medalists for the United States in track and field
Track and field athletes from New York (state)
Medalists at the 1900 Summer Olympics
Olympic male high jumpers
University of Pennsylvania Law School alumni
Burials at Forest Hill Cemetery (Utica, New York)
Penn Quakers men's track and field athletes